The 1997–98 Belarusian Cup was the seventh season of the annual Belarusian football cup competition. Contrary to the league season, it is conducted in a fall-spring rhythm. It began on 2 August 1997 with the first of five rounds and ended on 26 May 1998 with the final at the Dinamo Stadium in Minsk.

FC Belshina Bobruisk were the defending champions, having defeated FC Dinamo-93 Minsk in the 1997 final, but were knocked out in the second round by FC MPKC Mozyr.

FC Lokomotiv-96 Vitebsk won the final against FC Dinamo Minsk after extra time to win their first title.

Round of 32
The games were played on 2, 3 August and 9 October 1997.

|}

Round of 32
The games were played on 16 and 18 October 1997.

|}

Quarterfinals
The games were played on 30 April 1998.

|}

Semifinals
The games were played on 14 May 1998.

|}

Final
The final match was played on 26 May 1998 at the Dinamo Stadium in Minsk.

External links
 RSSSF

Belarusian Cup seasons
Belarusian Cup
Cup
Cup